Ochsenfurt  is a town in the district of Würzburg, in Bavaria, Germany. Ochsenfurt is located on the left bank of the River Main and has around 11,000 inhabitants. This makes it the largest town in Würzburg district.

Name
Like Oxford, the town of Ochsenfurt is named after a ford where oxen crossed the river.

Geography

Location

Subdivision
The Stadtteile of Ochsenfurt are: Darstadt, Erlach, Goßmannsdorf, Hohestadt, Hopferstadt, Kleinochsenfurt, Tückelhausen, and Zeubelried.

History

Ochsenfurt was one of the places in Germany where King Richard I of England was detained in 1193 while on his way to England from the Third Crusade.

A monastery, Tückelhausen Charterhouse, dedicated to Saints Lambert, John the Baptist, and George, was founded in 1138 by Otto I, Bishop of Bamberg, as a double canonry of the Premonstratensians. From 1351 it belonged to the Carthusians and was secularised in 1803.

Attractions
The charterhouse was largely converted for private residential use and since 1991 contains a museum of Carthusian life. 

Ochsenfurt also features several Protestant and Roman Catholic churches, among them that of St Michael (Michaelskapelle), a Gothic edifice

Economy

In 1911 there was a considerable trade in wine and agricultural products, other industries being brewing and malting. Ochsenfurt also has one of the largest sugar factories in Germany.

Governance

Mayor
Peter Juks (UWG) is the mayor of Ochsenfurt.

Town twinning

Ochsenfurt is twinned with:

Gallery

Notable people
 Hieronymus Dungersheim (1465-1540), Catholic theologian
 Tomas Oral (born 1973), football player and coach
 Maximilian Götz (born 1986), racing driver

Bibliography
 Die Kunstdenkmäler von Unterfranken, Bd. 1: Bezirksamt Ochsenfurt. 2nd edition 1983.

See also
List of medieval stone bridges in Germany

References

External links

 Official town website (German)
 Website of the Diocese of Würzburg: the Carthusian Museum 

Würzburg (district)
Populated places on the Main basin
Populated riverside places in Germany